Saint Arnaud, the French for Saint Arnold, is the name of the following places (all named after Armand-Jacques Leroy de Saint-Arnaud French Minister of War until the Crimean War):

In Algeria
 Saint Arnaud, former name of El Eulma, Algeria

In Australia
 St Arnaud, Victoria
 St Arnaud Box-Ironbark Region, Victoria
 St Arnaud Range National Park, former name of Kara Kara National Park, Victoria

In New Zealand
 Saint Arnaud, New Zealand, in the Tasman District
 Saint Arnaud Range, Tasman District, New Zealand

See also  
 Arnaud (disambiguation)